

Events
 Tanaide Mor mac Dúinnín Ó Maolconaire becomes Ollamh Síl Muireadaigh
 Three  composed for the death of Louis IX of France:
Guilhem d'Autpol composed 
Raimon Gaucelm de Bezers composed 
Austorc de Segret composed  (a Crusading song more than a planh)
 Joan Esteve composed , a planh on the death of Amalric I of Narbonne

Births
 Cino da Pistoia (died 1336), Italian jurist and poet

Deaths
 Hywel ab Owain Gwynedd (born unknown), Welsh
 Dubsúilech Ó Maolconaire (born unknown), an Ollamh Síl Muireadaigh

13th-century poetry
Poetry